Darragh Kenny (born 24 January 1988) is an Irish equestrian who competes in the sport of show jumping. He owns and runs Oakland Ventures LLC alongside Hardin Towell and has consistently been in the world top 10 riders. As of May 2020, Kenny is ranked 7th in the world.

Career development 
Kenny is the son of two horse trainers in Ireland, and grew up around horses. He showed talent early on and competed in his first Grand Prix at the age of 14. He qualified for the Dublin Horse Show where he won a training bursary to work with Missy Clark and John Brennan at their North Run Stables in Warren, Vermont in 2007, which brought him to America to compete at the Winter Equestrian Festival in Wellington, Florida. Under Clark's guidance, Kenny was given the rides on Obelix and Gael Force, horses that he qualified for his first FEI World Cup Finals on and continued to campaign at the highest level including representing Ireland in Nations Cup events.

In 2012, after many successful years with North Run, Kenny left to found his own Oakland Ventures LLC, where he both rode and trained clients. Within a few months, Kenny had acquired a dozen horses in his stable thanks to help from Don Stewart and Mavis Spencer. Kenny quickly formed partnerships with Caroline Lloyd to rider her horse Sans Soucis Z  (with whom he won the Aga Khan Trophy at the Dublin Horse Show) and the Hyperion Stud group which provided him with several horses including Imothep who was his mount at the 2014 World Equestrian Games in Normandy, France where he placed 12th individually. Kenny was partnered with Hyperion Stud through 2019.

Recently, Kenny has campaigned many top horses including Babalou 41 (owned by Dr. Jack Snyder) who was recently retired, Balou du Reventon, Cassini Z & Classic Dream (owned by Ann Thompson), and Billy Dorito (owned by Vlock Show Stables). Alongside business partner Hardin Towell, Kenny trains several young riders including Teddy Vlock, Maggie Hill, and Kirsten Ostling.

Kenny has a newly formed partnership with Heathman Farm & the Stinnett family who have added top horses to Kenny's string. Heathman Farm's VDL Cartello will take the spotlight with Kenny for this years 2020 Olympics in Tokyo. Kenny also rides Heathman Farm's idalville d'esprit, Storiall Blue & Sangris Boy.

Major results

References

External links
 
 
 
 

1988 births
Living people
Irish male equestrians
Olympic equestrians of Ireland
Equestrians at the 2020 Summer Olympics